Jean de Crawhez (born 2 May 1934) is a Belgian bobsledder. He competed in the four-man event at the 1964 Winter Olympics.

References

External links
 

1934 births
Living people
Belgian male bobsledders
Olympic bobsledders of Belgium
Bobsledders at the 1964 Winter Olympics
Sportspeople from Namur (city)